Section 31, in the fictional universe of Star Trek, is an autonomous intelligence and defense organization that carries out covert operations for the United Federation of Planets. Created by Ira Steven Behr for the Star Trek: Deep Space Nine episode "Inquisition", the organization was intended to act as a counterbalance to the utopian portrayal of the Federation.

Section 31 settings and characters have appeared in dozens of episodes, novels and comics. In 2019, CBS announced a new series was in development about Section 31, starring Michelle Yeoh.

Production 
Ira Steven Behr was inspired by a line of dialogue from Deep Space Nine episode "The Maquis" spoken by Commander Benjamin Sisko: "It's easy to be a saint in paradise." Behr said in the 1999 reference companion to the series, "Why is Earth a paradise in the twenty-fourth century? Well, maybe it's because there's someone watching over it and doing the nasty stuff that no one wants to think about." He expressed an interest of exploring what life was really like for those living the fictional 24th century, saying "Is it this paradise, or are there, as Harold Pinter said, 'Weasels under the coffee table'."

The name, Section 31, is explained in the story as being taken from the fictional Starfleet Charter: Article 14, Section 31. The article, according to agents, allowed for extraordinary measures to be taken in times of extreme threat. Such measures included malicious sabotage of enemy installations and technology, biological warfare, and preemptive assassination.

According to Ronald D. Moore there was considerable debate on the origin of the organization, in particular on how the organization was formed and how long ago.

Costume designer Bob Blackman chose the black leather costumes worn by Section 31 agents to appear fascistic. Behr had asked for dark black, severe, hostile looking costumes. In Star Trek: The Human Frontier, Michèle and Duncan Barrett explain that Section 31 agents not wearing Starfleet uniforms or dressing as Federation citizens further enhanced their role as an organization that is not constrained by ethics.

Reception 
Writer David Weddle said many fans felt Section 31 betrayed the value system created by Gene Roddenberry, while others were indifferent or intrigued. "Fans would get into these long ethical and political arguments, really struggling with issues like that, which was great to see." Moore replied to criticisms of betrayal saying, "The idea that there's a rogue element within the Federation doing dark deeds outside the normal chain of command is certainly a provocative one."

Actor Jeffrey Combs, who portrayed Weyoun in Deep Space Nine, enjoyed the appearances of Section 31, saying the stories "gave everything a real flair."

Characters 
In order of appearance:

Appearances

Deep Space Nine (1998–99) 

 "Inquisition"
 "Inter Arma Enim Silent Leges"
 "Extreme Measures"

Enterprise (2005)

 "Affliction"
 "Divergence"
 "Demons"
 "Terra Prime"

Films 
 Star Trek Into Darkness (2013)

Discovery (2018–19) 

 "Will You Take My Hand?" (Season 1, bonus scene)
 "Point of Light"
 "Saints of Imperfection"
 "The Sounds of Thunder"
 "Light and Shadows"
 "If Memory Serves"
 "Project Daedalus"
 "The Red Angel"
 "Perpetual Infinity"
 "Through the Valley of Shadows"
 "Such Sweet Sorrow"
 "Such Sweet Sorrow, Part 2"

Lower Decks (2020) 

 "Envoys" (references to Section 31)
 "Crisis Point 2: Paradoxus"

Tie-in media

Novels 

Section 31 characters and settings appear in the following novels:

Section 31 crossover (2001–2017) 

Star Trek: Section 31 is a crossover miniseries of thematically linked novels featuring Section 31. The series was relaunched in 2014 as part of the Deep Space Nine book line.

Next Generation (2004–2019) 

The following Star Trek: The Next Generation novels include Section 31 characters:

Enterprise (2007–2017) 

The following Star Trek: Enterprise novels include Section 31 characters:

Typhon Pact  (2010–2012) 

Star Trek: Typhon Pact crossover series continues events introduced in the Destiny series, by David Mack, and A Singular Destiny, by Keith DeCandido.

Section 31 relaunch (2014–2017) 
Novels linked to Deep Space Nine and Next Generation relaunch book lines.

Graphic novels 
All comics published by IDW Publishing.

Star Trek Online (2010–2015) 

Star Trek Online is a massively multiplayer online role-playing game developed by Cryptic Studios. The game has continued to receive updates which are organized into episodes containing five to seven missions each. All Section 31 missions are introduced by Franklin Drake, a character created for the game.

See also 
 Starfleet
 United Federation of Planets

References

Further reading

External links 

Star Trek organizations
Fictional intelligence agencies